FC Slovan Havlíčkův Brod is a Czech football club located in Havlíčkův Brod. It currently plays in the Czech Fourth Division. The club was founded in 1911 and celebrated its centenary in 2011. The club has taken part in the Czech Cup on numerous occasions, reaching the first round in 2007–08.

References

External links
 

Football clubs in the Czech Republic
Association football clubs established in 1911